The utilization of nuclear power in Kazakhstan began with Kazakhstan's first nuclear power plant, the BN-350 fast-neutron reactor in Aktau, operating from 1973 to 1999, a Soviet era prototype investment preceding the BN-600 reactor. Since then, it has only operated four smaller research reactors and did not have nuclear electricity production capabilities. Kazakhstan is the number one country in the world for uranium production volumes, which is used for nuclear fuel. Current plans, reaching back to 1997, foresee the construction of two new nuclear power plants near the towns of Ulken and Kurchatov.

First nuclear reactors 
Kazakhstan's first nuclear power reactor was the sodium-cooled BN-350 fast-neutron reactor at the Mangyshlak Nuclear Power Plant in Aktau on the shore of the Caspian Sea. Construction began in 1964, when Kazakhstan was still part of the USSR. The plant first produced electricity in 1973 with an output of 350 MWe. In addition, BN-350 was also used for producing plutonium for the nuclear weappons program and for desalination to supply fresh water. Besides the BN-350 power reactor, Kazakhstan has four research reactors, three at the former Semipalatinsk Test Site (EWG 1, IGR and RA) and one in Alatau, near the former capital of Almaty (WWR-K).

After Kazakhstan's declaration of independence from the Soviet Union in 1991, the territory was denuclearized by returning all nuclear warheads to the Russian Federation in 1994. The Mangyshlak plant's lifetime of the reactor officially finished in 1993, and in June 1994, the reactor was forced to shut down because of a lack of funds to buy fuel. By 1995, the plant's operating license had expired. When plutonium-bearing spent fuel stopped being produced, reactor operations finally ended in 1999.

Kazakhstan has long played an important role for nuclear fuel production. Uranium exploration began in 1943. The country has since expanded its uranium mining capabilities and in 2011 became the largest producer of uranium in the world. Exported uranium from Kazakhstan supplies nuclear reactors of many countries worldwide.

Plans for new reactors 
Plans for the construction of new nuclear reactors reach back to 1997, before the final shutdown of BN-350. In 1998 the Kazakh government announced its intentions to construct a new power reactor near lake Balkash, which however was not implemented in the following years. Since 2006, plans for new reactors were discussed with Russia, and a memorandum of understanding for the construction of reactors was signed with the Russian nuclear corporation Rosatom in 2014. The first reactor was then foreseen to be sited near Kurchatov.

In 2013 Kazakhstan adopted a “Green Economy Concept” to shift its 97% fossil fuel electricity production to at least 50% renewable and nuclear sources until 2050, and reach full carbon neutrality by 2060. To this end, the government commits to the development of nuclear capacities:

Nevertheless, the nuclear plant construction was still postponed for a “lack of immediate need” for additional electricity in 2016, but prospected energy requirements show a 1400 MW deficit in the southern zone as early as 2028.

An International Atomic Energy Agency report at the government’s request from 2016 declared that “Kazakhstan is well-positioned to continue developing its civilian nuclear program”. From 2019 to 2022 the planning has picked up speed, and several suppliers from different countries have submitted offers for plant constructions. As of 2022 the government was evaluating six potential suppliers: NuScale Power (USA), US-Japanese consortium of GEH, KHNP (Korea), CNNC (China), Rosatom (Russia) and EDF (France). The current government plan foresees the construction of the first plant with 1200 MW at Ulken near lake Balkash, and the second plant at Kurchatov with 2× 300 MW. Until 2035 Kazakhstan wants to have 2.4 GW of nuclear power capacity.

References 

Nuclear power in Kazakhstan
Kazakhstan
Kazakhstan
Nuclear technology in Kazakhstan
Electric power in Kazakhstan
Power